Eddy Kapend is a former military officer from the Democratic Republic of the Congo who served as former president Laurent-Désiré Kabila's close military advisor, and as the second-in-command of the Congolese army. In 2001, Kabila was assassinated by Rachidi Kasereka in his office, and Kapend killed Rachidi minutes later. In a trial widely criticized by international human rights organizations, Kapend and 80 others were convicted of participation in Kabila's killing, and were sentenced to death. A 2011 investigative film, Murder in Kinshasa, reviewed evidence that Kapend was not involved in Kabila's killing.

After Kabila was killed, Justice Minister Mwenze Kongolo and Kapend reported that Kabila had named his son Joseph as successor should Kabila die in office.

In 2021, President Félix Tshisekedi released Kapend from prison on humanitarian grounds.

References

Citations

References cited
 BBC, 8 January 2021, Laurent Kabila: DR Congo frees soldiers linked to assassination. .
 Michael Newton, 2014, Famous Assassinations in World History: An Encyclopedia. ABC CLIO, .
 Filip Reyntjens, 2013, Political Governance in Post-Genocide Rwanda. Cambridge University Press, .
 Thomas Turner, 2013a, Congo. Wiley, .
 Thomas Turner, 2013b, Will Rwanda End its Meddling in Congo? Current History, Volume 112, Issue 754, pp. 188–194.
 Arnaud Zajtman, 28 October 2011, "Murder in Kinshasa." Al Jazeera, .
 Arnaud Zajtman and Marlène Rabaud, 9 June 2011, "Murder in Kinshasa." Al Jazeera, .

People of the Congo Crisis
Democratic Republic of the Congo rebels
Living people
Year of birth missing (living people)